Mina Spiegel Rees (August 2, 1902 – October 25, 1997) was an American mathematician. She was the first female President of the American Association for the Advancement of Science (1971) and head of the mathematics department of the Office of Naval Research of the United States. Rees was a pioneer in the history of computing and helped establish funding streams and institutional infrastructure for research. Rees was also the founding president and president emerita of the Graduate School and University Center at CUNY. She received the Public Welfare Medal, the highest honor of the National Academy of Sciences; the King's Medal for Service in the Cause of Freedom (UK) and at least 18 honorary doctorates.

Personal life
Rees was the daughter of Moses and Alice Louise (née Stackhouse) Rees. The family moved from Cleveland, Ohio to New York where Rees received her primary education in the city's public schools. In 1955, Rees married physician Leopold Brahdy (1892–1977). She died in 1997 at the Mary Manning Walsh home in Manhattan.

Education
She was valedictorian at Hunter College High School in New York City.  She graduated summa cum laude with a math major at Hunter College in 1923.   She received a master's degree in mathematics from Columbia University in 1925, where she also studied law. At that time she was told unofficially that "the Columbia mathematics department was not really interested in having women candidates for Ph.D's". She started teaching at Hunter College then took a sabbatical to study for the doctorate at the University of Chicago in 1929. She earned her doctorate in 1931 with a dissertation on abstract algebra titled "Division algebras associated with an equation whose group has four generators," published in the American Journal of Mathematics, Vol 54 (Jan. 1932), 51-65. Her advisor was Leonard Dickson.

Career
1925–32: Instructor at Hunter College (on leave 1929–1931 while earning a doctorate at the University of Chicago)
1932–40: Assistant Professor at Hunter College.
1940: Associate Professor at Hunter College
World War II: Technical Aide/Executive Assistant with the Applied Mathematics Panel at Office of Scientific Research and Development.
1947: ACM Council member 
1945–51: Head of Mathematics branch at the Office of Naval Research
1952–53: Deputy Science Director for the Office of Naval Research.
1953–61: Dean of Faculty at Hunter College
1961–67: Full Professor and First Dean of Graduate Studies at City University of New York
1964–70: Member, U.S. National Science Board 
1967–69: Provost of the Graduate School and University Center at CUNY.
1969–72: Founding president (and, in 1972, first president emerita) of the Graduate School and University Center at CUNY
1971: First female president of the AAAS
 First female chair, U.S. Council of Graduate Schools

During her time at the Office of Naval Research, Rees headed research in a variety of programs, including hydrofoils, logistics, computers, and numerical development for applications such as rocketry and defense against submarines. She was especially instrumental in developing the ONR's implementation of projects studying mathematical algorithms for computing, as well as university research programs to build computers such as Project Whirlwind at MIT.  She was an early proponent of magnetic-core and electrostatic memory, the use of transistor components rather than vacuum tubes, and the design of machines with visual displays and multiple inputs.

The New York Times wrote "Dr. Rees also had an important role in the growth and diversification of mathematical studies. Many of her ideas left their mark on fast computer technology.

"Dr. Rees enjoyed a crowning moment in 1969, when the 120,000-member American Association for the Advancement of Science elected her president. Women remained something of a rarity at that level in the scientific community, but she -- as Marie Curie, Lise Meitner and Margaret Mead before her -- had proved that scientific creativity was not just for men."

Honors 
In 1953, the council of the American Mathematical Society adopted a resolution reading stating that under Dr. Rees' "guidance, basic research in general, and especially in mathematics, received the most intelligent and wholehearted support. No greater wisdom and foresight could have been displayed and the whole postwar development of mathematical research in the United States owes an immeasurable debt to the pioneer work of the Office of Naval Research and to the alert, vigorous and farsighted policy conducted by Miss [sic] Rees."

In 1962 Rees received the first Award for Distinguished Service to Mathematics from the Mathematical Association of America. This was "for outstanding service to mathematics, other than mathematical research" and for "contributions [that] influence significantly the field of mathematics or mathematical education on a national scale."

In 1965, Rees was awarded the Achievement Award by the American Association of University Women, an award given annually in honor of women who have made outstanding contributions in their fields.

The Public Welfare Medal, the highest honor of the National Academy of Sciences, 1983, "in recognition of distinguished contributions in the application of science to the public welfare....for her contributions to the scientific enterprise, especially in mathematics, astronomy, and computer sciences, from wartime, through the transition from war to peace, and continuing today."

Kings Medal for Service in the Cause of Freedom (UK) and the President's Certificate of Merit (USA) for her important contributions during World War II.

At least 18 honorary doctorates.

Library of Graduate University of the City University of New York named the Mina Rees library in 1985.

The IEEE Computer Society's 1989 Computer Pioneer Award.

Notable publications 
 1932: "Division algebras associated with an equation whose group has four generators," American Journal of Mathematics 54: 51-65.
 1950: "The federal computing machine program" Science 112: 731-736.
 1952: (with Richard Courant and  Eugene Isaacson) "On the solution of nonlinear hyperbolic differential equations by finite differences", Communications on Pure and Applied Mathematics 5: 243-255.

References

Further reading
 Kathleen Broome Williams (2001) Improbable Warriors: Women Scientists and the U.S. Navy in World War II., Naval Institute Press, Annapolis, Maryland, .
 Williams' book focuses on the life of Mina Rees and three other notable women: Mary Sears (1905–1997); Florence van Straten (1913–1992); Grace Murray Hopper (1906–1992).
 Amy Shell-Gellasch (2001) In Service to Mathematics: The Life and Work of Mina Rees., Docent Press, Boston, . 
 Shell-Gellasch's book covers Rees' entire life.  It includes an extensive chapter on her PhD dissertation under L. E. Dickson at the University of Chicago as well as photographs from the CUNY archive.

External links 
 http://www.agnesscott.edu/Lriddle/women/rees.htm
 http://www.ams.org/notices/199807/memorial-rees.pdf
 http://archives.aaas.org/people.php?p_id=175
 http://www.ams.org/notices/199807/memorial-rees.pdf

1902 births
1997 deaths
American women mathematicians
Columbia University alumni
Fellows of the American Association for the Advancement of Science
Hunter College alumni
Hunter College faculty
Hunter College High School alumni
University of Chicago alumni
20th-century American mathematicians
20th-century women mathematicians
Mathematicians from New York (state)
Recipients of the King's Medal for Service in the Cause of Freedom
20th-century American women